Two ships of the French Navy have borne the name Libre, in honour of the concept of Liberty.

Ships 
  (1798), a barge
  (1798), a

See also 
 
  (1797), a lugger.
  (1800), an 8-gun bombship.

Notes and references

Notes

References

Bibliography 
 

French Navy ship names